Dexosarcophaga wyatti is a species of fly from Guyana.

References

Sarcophagidae
Insects described in 2000